Kastelen Tower is a ruined castle in the municipality of Alberswil of the Canton of Lucerne in Switzerland.  It is a Swiss heritage site of national significance.

See also
 List of castles in Switzerland

References

Cultural property of national significance in the canton of Lucerne
Castles in the canton of Lucerne
Ruined castles in Switzerland